Bungaban is a rural locality in the Western Downs Region, Queensland, Australia.

History 

Road infrastructure
The Leichhardt Highway runs past the western extremity.

References 

Western Downs Region
Localities in Queensland